Kolonia Biskupska  (German: Friedrichswille) is a village in the administrative district of Gmina Radłów, within Olesno County, Opole Voivodeship, in south-western Poland.

The village has a population of 186.

References

Kolonia Biskupska